The Mysore day gecko (Cnemaspis mysoriensis) is a species of diurnal gecko endemic to the Bangalore uplands in Karnataka state, South India. It is rock-dwelling and is found in deciduous forest tracts in mid-hills. This species occurs in Hosur / Krishnagiri hills of Tamil Nadu and Bangarapet Ramnagara and Tumkur districts in Karnataka state.

References

Cnemaspis
Endemic fauna of India
Reptiles of India
Reptiles described in 1853
Taxa named by Thomas C. Jerdon